A product integral is any product-based counterpart of the usual sum-based integral of calculus. The first product integral (Type I below) was developed by the mathematician Vito Volterra in 1887 to solve systems of linear differential equations. Other examples of product integrals are the geometric integral (Type II below), the bigeometric integral (Type III below), and some other integrals of non-Newtonian calculus.

Product integrals have found use in areas from epidemiology (the Kaplan–Meier estimator) to stochastic population dynamics using multiplication integrals (multigrals), analysis and quantum mechanics. The geometric integral, together with the geometric derivative,  is useful in image analysis and in the study of growth/decay phenomena (e.g., in economic growth, bacterial growth, and radioactive decay). The bigeometric integral, together with the bigeometric derivative, is useful in some applications of fractals, and in the theory of elasticity in economics.

This article adopts the "product"  notation for product integration instead of the "integral"  (usually modified by a superimposed "times" symbol or letter P) favoured by Volterra and others. An arbitrary classification of types is also adopted to impose some order in the field.

Basic definitions

The classical Riemann integral of a function  can be defined by the relation

where the limit is taken over all partitions of the interval  whose norms approach zero.

Roughly speaking, product integrals are similar, but take the limit of a product instead of the limit of a sum. They can be thought of as "continuous" versions of "discrete" products.

The most popular product integrals are the following:

Type I: Volterra integral

The type I product integral corresponds to Volterra's original definition. The following relationship exists for scalar functions :

which is not a multiplicative operator. (So the concepts of product integral and multiplicative integral are not the same).

The Volterra product integral is most useful when applied to matrix-valued functions or functions with values in a Banach algebra, where the last equality is no longer true (see the references below).

When applied to scalars belonging to a non-commutative field, to matrixes, and to operators, i.e. to mathematical objects that don't commute, the Volterra integral splits in two definitions 

Left Product integral

With the notation of left products (i.e. normal products applied from left)

Right Product Integral

With the notation of right products (i.e. applied from right)

Where  is the identity matrix and D is a partition of the interval [a,b] in the Riemann sense, i.e. the limit is over the maximum interval in the partition. 
Note how in this case time ordering comes evident in the definitions.

For scalar functions, the derivative in the Volterra system is the logarithmic derivative, and so the Volterra system is not a multiplicative calculus and is not a non-Newtonian calculus.

Type II: geometric integral

which is called the geometric integral and is a multiplicative operator.

This definition of the product integral is the continuous analog of the discrete product operator

(with ) and the multiplicative analog to the (normal/standard/additive) integral

(with ):

{| class="wikitable"
|-
!
! additive || multiplicative
|-
! discrete
|  || 
|-
! continuous
|||
|}

It is very useful in stochastics, where the log-likelihood (i.e. the logarithm of a product integral of independent random variables) equals the integral of the logarithm of these (infinitesimally many) random variables:

Type III: bigeometric integral

where r = ln a, and s = ln b.

The type III product integral is called the bigeometric integral and is a multiplicative operator.

Results

Basic results

The following results are for the type II product integral (the geometric integral). Other types produce other results.

 

 

 

 

 

The geometric integral (type II above) plays a central role in the geometric calculus, which is a multiplicative calculus. The inverse of the geometric integral, which is the geometric derivative, denoted , is defined using the following relationship:

 
Thus, the following can be concluded:
The fundamental theorem

 

Product rule

 

Quotient rule

 

Law of large numbers

 

where X is a random variable with probability distribution F(x).

Compare with the standard law of large numbers:

Lebesgue-type product-integrals

Just like the Lebesgue version of (classical) integrals, one can compute product integrals by approximating them with the product integrals of simple functions. Each type of product integral has a different form for simple functions.

Type I: Volterra integral

Because simple functions generalize step functions, in what follows we will only consider the special case of simple functions that are step functions. This will also make it easier to compare the Lebesgue definition with the Riemann definition.

Given a step function  with corresponding partition  and a tagged partition

 

one approximation of the "Riemann definition" of the type I product integral is given by

 

The (type I) product integral was defined to be, roughly speaking, the limit of these products by Ludwig Schlesinger in a 1931 article.

Another approximation of the "Riemann definition" of the type I product integral is defined as

 

When  is a constant function, the limit of the first type of approximation is equal to the second type of approximation. Notice that in general, for a step function, the value of the second type of approximation doesn't depend on the partition, as long as the partition is a refinement of the partition defining the step function, whereas the value of the first type of approximation does depend on the fineness of the partition, even when it is a refinement of the partition defining the step function.

It turns out that that for any product-integrable function , the limit of the first type of approximation equals the limit of the second type of approximation. Since, for step functions, the value of the second type of approximation doesn't depend on the fineness of the partition for partitions "fine enough", it makes sense to define the "Lebesgue (type I) product integral" of a step function as

 

where  is a tagged partition, and again  is the partition corresponding to the step function . (In contrast, the corresponding quantity would not be unambiguously defined using the first type of approximation.)

This generalizes to arbitrary measure spaces readily. If  is a measure space with measure , then for any product-integrable simple function  (i.e. a conical combination of the indicator functions for some disjoint measurable sets ), its type I product integral is defined to be

 

In the special case where ,  is Lebesgue measure, and all of the measurable sets  are intervals, one can verify that this is equal to the definition given above for that special case. Analogous to the theory of Lebesgue (classical) integrals, the Volterra product integral of any product-integrable function  can be written as the limit of an increasing sequence of Volterra product integrals of product-integrable simple functions.

Taking logarithms of both sides of the above definition, one gets that for any product-integrable simple function :

 
 

where we used the definition of integral for simple functions. Moreover, because continuous functions like  can be interchanged with limits, and the product integral of any product-integrable function  is equal to the limit of product integrals of simple functions, it follows that the relationship

 

holds generally for any product-integrable . This clearly generalizes the property mentioned above.

The Volterra product integral is multiplicative as a set function, which can be shown using the above property. More specifically, given a product-integrable function  one can define a set function  by defining, for every measurable set ,

 

Then for any two disjoint measurable sets  one has

 

This property can be contrasted with measures, which are additive set functions.

However the Volterra product integral is not multiplicative as a functional. Given two product-integrable functions , and a measurable set , it is generally the case that

Type II: geometric integral

If  is a measure space with measure , then for any product-integrable simple function  (i.e. a conical combination of the indicator functions for some disjoint measurable sets ), its type II product integral is defined to be

 

This can be seen to generalize the definition given above.

Taking logarithms of both sides, we see that for any product-integrable simple function :

 

where we have used the definition of the Lebesgue integral for simple functions. This observation, analogous to the one already made above, allows one to entirely reduce the "Lebesgue theory of geometric integrals" to the Lebesgue theory of (classical) integrals. In other words, because continuous functions like  and  can be interchanged with limits, and the product integral of any product-integrable function  is equal to the limit of some increasing sequence of product integrals of simple functions, it follows that the relationship

 

holds generally for any product-integrable . This generalizes the property of geometric integrals mentioned above.

See also

List of derivatives and integrals in alternative calculi
Indefinite product
Logarithmic derivative
Ordered exponential
Fractal derivative

References

External links
 Non-Newtonian calculus website
 Richard Gill, Product Integration
 Richard Gill, Product Integral Symbol
 David Manura, Product Calculus
 Tyler Neylon, Easy bounds for n!
 An Introduction to Multigral (Product) and Dx-less Calculus
 Notes On the Lax equation
 Antonín Slavík, An introduction to product integration
 Antonín Slavík, Henstock–Kurzweil and McShane product integration

Integrals
Multiplication
Non-Newtonian calculus